The Halde Rheinpreußen is a spoil tip in the German city Moers which lies  above its ambit. It is part of the category Panoramas of the Ruhr Industrial Heritage Trail.

In 1963, the spoil tip was heaped up with materials of the pit 5/9, i.e. the mine Zeche Rheinpreußen.

In autumn 1999, the artist Otto Piene, co-founder of the ZERO group, presented his idea of a mining lamp memorial called Geleucht for the first time. In 2007, the circa  and  heavy landmark was constructed on the Halde Rheinpreußen.

Since the dedication of the Geleucht on 17 September 2007, the mining lamp memorial and the lamp poles are illuminated every night. The stairs to the observation deck are opened on a regular basis.

Gallery

References

External links

The Halde Rheinpreußen on the website of the Industrial Heritage Trail 
Information about the spoil tips of Moers on its website 

 

Moers
Mining in Germany
Mountains and hills of North Rhine-Westphalia
Artificial hills